Rolf Kanies (born 21 December 1957) is a German actor who played many high-profile roles on the stage before switching to a career in film and television in 1997. Since then Rolf has specialized in German and international film and television. Movies he has played in have been nominated for a variety of international awards, including an Oscar.

Early life and education
Born in Bielefeld, Kanies studied at the Westfälische Schauspielschule Bochum and at the Universität der Künste (UdK) Berlin. Upon completing his studies, he embarked on a career in the theatre. His first engagement was at the Hebbel-Theater in Berlin, followed by other works at the Schauspielhaus Bochum, the Staatstheater Kassel and productions in Krefeld, Neuss, Cologne, Weimar, Graz (Austria), Basel (Switzerland) and at the Garsington Opera Festival (Oxford, England).

Career
Kanies' roles have included many Shakespearean characters such as Hamlet, Romeo, Mercutio, Macbeth, Theseus/Oberon (A Midsummer Night's Dream), Sir Toby (Twelfth Night), Dromio of Ephesus (A Comedy of Errors) and Lucio (Measure for Measure). Other prominent roles were those of Faust, Orest (Iphigenia) and Biff (Death of a Salesman).

He also played several lead roles in musicals.

Starting in the 1990s, Kanies played in a large variety of German television series and movies and in eight feature films.  His film debut was Dark Days, directed by Margarethe von Trotta. In 1998, Rolf had his first international appearance in the science fiction series Lexx, in which he played Reginald J. Priest, a troubled alien who is also the President of the United States. In the same year Kanies played Adolf Hitler in the American production Joe and Max directed by Steve James (STARZ! Pictures).  In 2004, Kanies performed the role of Gen. Hans Krebs in Oliver Hirschbiegel's Downfall, which was nominated for an Oscar.  In 2008, he played the war veteran Friedrich Hoch in A Woman In Berlin, directed by Max Färberböck, which won the Best International Feature Award at the Santa Barbara International Film Festival in 2009.  In 2008 Rolf also appeared in the movie The Countess as Count Krajevo, a film by Julie Delpy.

Filmography

Film
2000: Mister Boogie
2001:  - Daniel's Father
2002: Joe and Max - Adolf Hitler
2003: Falling Grace - George
2004: Der Untergang - General Hans Krebs
2006: The Conclave - Cardinal Bessarion
2008: The Lord of Edessa - Eric Malik
2008: A Woman in Berlin - Friedrich Hoch
2008: 10 Sekunden - Ebi Koch
2009: The Countess - Count Krajevo
2009: Für Miriam - Martin Fleißer
2011: Tage die bleiben - Jürgen
2011:  - Oberst Tapilin
2011: Blissestraße - Anton
2014:  - William de Villiers
2015: Hitman: Agent 47 - Dr. Delriego
2016:  - William de Villiers
2017: The Young Karl Marx - Moses Hess
2018: The Silent Revolution - Wardetzki

Television

1999:  - Rolf
1999: Countdown at Sea - Kapitän zur See van Bergen
2000: Der Mörder in Dir - Herr Kowalsky
2001: Verliebte Jungs - Vermieter Herr Wagner
2001: Wilsberg: Wilsberg und der Mord ohne Leiche - Herbert Schering
2002: Die Nacht, in der ganz ehrlich niemand Sex hatte - Arbeitsamtberater
2002: Joe and Max - Adolf Hitler
2002: Inspektor Ringo Rolle - Top oder Flop - Dr. Alexander Brombeck
2002: Lexx - Reginald J. Priest
2003: Der Fussfesselmörder - Professor
2003: Novaks Ultimatum - Staatssekretär Schuster
2003: Tatort - Atlantis - Peter Radke
2004: Kommissar Rex: "Nachts im Spital - Dr. Ballak
2004: Eva Blond - Emre Aslan
2004: München 7 - Mann am Rathausturm
2005: Mutter aus heiterem Himmel - Norbert Neumann
2005: Eine Liebe in Saigon - Werner Krantz
2005: Heimliche Liebe - Der Schüler und die Postbotin - Matthias Reinhardt
2005: Tatort - Im Alleingang - Heiko Eckermann
2006: Tatort - Der Lippenstiftmörder - Professor Klammroth
2006: Himmel über Australien - Steve
2006:  - Martin Degenhard
2006:  - Prosecutor Dr. Edgar Fink
2007:  - Georgios Vimbos
2007: KDD – Kriminaldauerdienst - Verwirrungen - Reimer
2007: Liebe auf Kredit - Uli
2007: Polizeiruf 110 - Tod in der Bank - Walter Conrad
2008: Die Hitzewelle - Ministerpräsident Julius Schäfer
2008:  - Andreas Imhof
2008:  - Reibold
2008: Die Bienen – Tödliche Bedrohung - Dr. Alvarez
2008:  - Lautenschläger
2009:  - Onkel Jakub
2009: Das Paradies am Ende der Welt - Harry
2009: Eine Liebe in St. Petersburg - Boris Wronski (uncredited)
2009: Die kluge Bauerntochter - Hofrat von Müller
2009: Mein Flaschengeist und ich - Nidelöpfel
2009: Auftrag in Afrika - Van Heusen
2010: Blackout - Dr. Thomas Reinders
2010: Alpha 0.7 - Der Feind in dir - Uwe Gonzoldt
2010: Das Familiengeheimnis
2011:  - Vollmer
2012: Rommel - Oberst Eberhard Finckh

Theater
 1979 Schauspielhaus Bochum
 1981 Schauspielhaus Bochum
 1981 Hebbeltheater Berlin
 1982–1986 Schauspielhaus Graz
 1991 Schauspielhaus Bochum
 1996–1997 Staatstheater Kassel
 1997 RLT Neuss
 1998 OD-Theater Basel "Don Carlos"
 1998 Kunstfest Weimar " Sturm und Drang"
 1999 Garsington Opera Festival "Entführung aus dem Serail"
 2000 Schauspiel Berlin "Warten auf Godot"

References

External links
 
 http://www.rolfkanies.com Rolf Kanies' Homepage

1957 births
Living people
20th-century German male actors
21st-century German male actors
Actors from Bielefeld
German male film actors
German male television actors
Male actors from Berlin